Under the Whyte notation for the classification of steam locomotives by wheel arrangement, the  is a Garratt articulated locomotive. The wheel arrangement is effectively two 2-8-0 locomotives operating back to back, with the boiler and cab suspended between the two power units. Each power unit has a single pair of leading wheels in a leading truck, followed by four coupled pairs of driving wheels and no trailing wheels. Since the 2-8-0 type is sometimes known as a Consolidation, the corresponding Garratt type could be referred to as a Double Consolidation.

Overview
This Garratt wheel arrangement was somewhat common, especially for locomotives intended for freight service. The first  locomotive was a single metre gauge locomotive built by Beyer, Peacock & Company in 1924 for the Burma Railways as their class GA.I. The second, and perhaps the better known, was the single Class U1 of the London & North Eastern Railway (LNER), built in 1925.

Use

Burma
Apart from their first single class GA.I locomotive of 1924, the  Burma Railways acquired another locomotive from Beyer, Peacock & Company in 1927, classifying it GA.II. In that same year, another four of class GA.III were placed in service, also from Beyer, Peacock. In 1929, Krupp of Essen in Germany delivered eight more, designated Class GA.IV.

India
The  Bengal Nagpur Railway in India used two of the class HSG, built by Beyer, Peacock & Company in 1925.

Ten  examples were purchased by the British War Department in 1943 and used on the Bengal Assam Railway in India as their Class MWGX.

Mauritius

The Mauritius Railway owned three   Garratts, also built by Beyer, Peacock & Company in 1927.

Turkey
The Ottoman Railways in Turkey acquired a single   Garratt from Beyer, Peacock & Company in 1927.

United Kingdom

The London & North Eastern Railway (LNER) owned a single Class U1 Garratt, built by Beyer, Peacock & Company in 1925. It was designed by Nigel Gresley for banking coal trains over the Worsborough Bank, a steeply graded line in South Yorkshire and part of the Woodhead line. The Class U1 was both the longest and the most powerful steam locomotive ever to run in the United Kingdom.

References

External links

 
1D+D1 locomotives
8,2-8-0